</noinclude>
This is a list of estimated global populations of Felidae species. This list is not comprehensive, as not all Felidaes have had their numbers qualified.

Cats

Tigers

Lions

See also 

 Lists of organisms by population
 Lists of mammals by population

References 

Lists of felids